In mathematics, the permutoassociahedron is an -dimensional polytope whose vertices correspond to the bracketings of the permutations of  terms and whose edges connect two bracketings that can be obtained from one another either by moving a pair of brackets using associativity or by transposing two consecutive terms that are not separated by a bracket.

The permutoassociahedron was first defined as a CW complex by Mikhail Kapranov who noted that this structure appears implicitly in Mac Lane's coherence theorem for symmetric and braided categories as well as in Vladimir Drinfeld's work on the Knizhnik–Zamolodchikov equations. It was constructed as a convex polytope by Victor Reiner and Günter M. Ziegler.

Examples 

The first two vertices are reached from  via associativity and the third via a transposition. The vertex  is adjacent to four vertices. This illustrates that, in dimension  and above, the permutoassociahedron is not a simple polytope.

Properties 

The -dimensional permutoassociahedron has
 
vertices. This is the product between the number of permutations of  terms and the number of all possible bracketings of any such permutation. The former number is equal to the factorial  and the later is the th Catalan number.

By its description in terms of bracketed permutations, the 1-skeleton of the permutoassociahedron is a flip graph with two different kinds of flips (associativity and transpositions).

See also 

 Permutohedron
 Associahedron
 Cyclohedron

References 

Permutations
Polytopes